Shoestring Falls (also called Siah Falls) is a waterfall, about  high, fed by an unnamed stream coming from Malachite Glacier in the Alpine Lakes Wilderness Area, King County, Washington, United States.

Notes

Waterfalls of King County, Washington